The straight or running stitch is the basic stitch in hand-sewing and embroidery, on which all other forms of sewing are based.  The stitch is worked by passing the needle in and out of the fabric at a regular distance. All other stitches are created by varying the straight stitch in length, spacing, and direction. 

Some sources only use the term straight stitch to refer to the individual stitch or its family of related stitches, while others use it interchangeably with or in place of running stitch. Running stitch will never be used to refer to a single stitch since a single running stitch is a straight stitch. 

Running stitches are most often not visible as they are used to close seams.

Running stitch, Holbein or double-running stitch, satin stitch and darning stitch are all classed as straight or flat stitches.  Backstitch is also sometimes included in this category.

Uses

Embroidery

Seams, Hems, and Tailoring
Running stitches are used in hand-sewing and tailoring to sew basic seams, hems and gathers; in hand patchwork to assemble pieces of light fabrics; and in quilting to hold the fabric layers and batting or wadding in place.  Loosely spaced rows of short running stitches are used to support padded satin stitch.

Darning
Darning has two purposes, decorative and functional, though it is often both. Darning for decorative purposes, often referred to as Pattern darning, is an ancient technique in which parallel rows of straight stitches in varying lengths are arranged to form geometric patterns.  Japanese Kogin embroidery is a pattern darning style from the island of Honshū, often worked in white cotton thread on rough, dark blue indigo-dyed linen.

Running stitches are a component of many traditional embroidery styles, including kantha of India and Bangladesh, and Japanese sashiko quilting and other embroidery styles such as pattern darning and redwork.

Related stitches

The running stitch family includes looped running stitches, laced running stitches, whipped running stitches, and others like the Holbein stitch, seed stitch and more.
Basting stitches, also called "tailor's tack", are long-running stitches used to keep two pieces of fabric or trim aligned during final sewing, or to otherwise temporarily sew two pieces together.
Darning stitches are closely spaced parallel rows of running stitches used to fill or reinforce worn areas of a textile, or as decoration.
Holbein or double-running stitches have a second row of running stitches worked in a reverse direction in between the stitches of the first pass, to make a solid line of stitching.
Double darning stitches are closely spaced (but not overlapping) rows of Holbein stitches.

Stitch gallery

See also 

 Blackwork embroidery
 Darning
 Embroidery stitches

References

Further reading
Caulfield, S.F.A., and B.C. Saward, The Dictionary of Needlework, 1885.
Christie, Grace (Mrs. Archibald Christie: Embroidery and Tapestry Weaving, London, John Hogg, 1912
Eaton, Jan. Mary Thomas's Dictionary of Embroidery Stitches, Revised by Jan Eaton. London: Hodder&Stoughton, 1989. 
Enthoven, Jacqueline: The Creative Stitches of Embroidery, Van Norstrand Rheinhold, 1964, 
Reader's Digest, Complete Guide to Needlework. The Reader's Digest Association, Inc. (March 1992). 
Levey, S. M. and D. King, The Victoria and Albert Museum's Textile Collection Vol. 3: Embroidery in Britain from 1200 to 1750, Victoria and Albert Museum, 1993, 
Sarah's Hand Embroidery Tutorials.

External links

The  Crimson Thread of Kinship  is a 12-metre-long embroidery predominantly using a straight stitch at the National Museum of Australia

Embroidery stitches